John D. Eyles (born 1946) is a Canadian geographer, having been a Distinguished University Professor at McMaster University. In 2001, he was elected fellow of the Royal Society of Canada.  Eyles is currently within the School of Geography and Earth Sciences, but holds appointments in Clinical Epidemiology and Biostatistics, Sociology, and the Centre for Health Economics and Policy analysis.

References

Academic staff of McMaster University
Canadian geographers
Social geographers
1946 births
Fellows of the Royal Society of Canada
Living people